A Very Secret Service is a French comedy-drama series created by Jean-François Halin and produced by Gilles de Verdière.

Premise
In 1960, young André Merlaux eagerly accepts a cryptic summons to take a position as a trainee officer with the French Secret Services (based on the Service de Documentation Extérieure et de Contre-Espionnage). He will be watched over by the operations director Moïse, and reluctantly mentored by senior colleagues Moulinier (in charge of African affairs), Jacquard (Algeria), and Calot (Eastern Bloc). It is the height of the Cold War and the position of France as a Great Power is in crisis, faced with independence challenges from the colonies of French West Africa, above all the fight over the independence of Algeria. French society is changing at home as well, with a rising counterculture exemplified by growing feminism and New Wave cinema.

Cast and characters

Main cast
 Hugo Becker as André Merlaux
 Wilfred Benaïche as Colonel Maurice Mercaillon
 Christophe Kourotchkine as Georges Préjean "Moïse"
 Mathilde Warnier as Sophie Mercaillon
 Karim Barras as Jacky Jacquard
 Bruno Paviot as Roger Moulinier
 Jean-Édouard Bodziak as Jean-René Calot
 Marie-Julie Baup as Marie-Jo Cotin

Secondary characters
 Joséphine de La Baume as Miss Clayborn
 Antoine Gouy as Henri Lechiot / Hervé Gomez / Schmid
 Philippe Resimont as Father Jean
 Julie Farenc as Nathalie
 Khalid Maadour as Moktar
 Stéphanie Fatout as Irène Mercaillon
 Axelle Simon as Marthe
 Baptiste Sornin as Planton, reception desk employee

Development
Principal photography for the first series took place between October 2014 and February 2015 in Île-de-France and Morocco.

The series recalls OSS 117: Cairo, Nest of Spies in style and tone, although it is slightly more serious (writer Halin was also credited for the screenplay of all three OSS 117 films, and one of the three Les Guignols authors). The show uses historical events as background or foreground for its action, similar to Mad Men (such as the Algerian war of independence and the first French nuclear test, Gerboise Bleue).

Arte's president of fiction, Olivier Wotling, confirmed a second season to Le Figaros TV Magazine on July 3, 2016.

In a March 2019 interview with the French language outlet PureMédias, Hugo Becker expressed doubt regarding the likelihood of a third season, stating that the series had reached "the end of the arc," and adding that while "there might be material... the story is complete and I think that's fine." As an aside, however, several characters (including Moulinier, Jacquard, and Calot) as well as the SDECE office sets from the television show are vividly featured in OSS 117: From Africa with Love (2021), indirectly creating a shared universe between the two franchises.

Episodes

Season 1 (2015)

Season 2 (2018)

Release
It was commissioned by Arte, where it premiered in 2015, and was later distributed worldwide by Netflix on 1 July 2016. The second season appeared on Netflix in August 2018.

Reception 
Steve Greene of IndieWire wrote that despite a "certain level of absurdity", the show was a "pretty well-calibrated balance between homage and parody".

References

External links
 

2015 French television series debuts
Television shows set in Paris
Television series set in 1960
Espionage television series
French-language Netflix original programming
French spy films
French spy comedy films
French comedy-drama television series
2010s French drama television series
2010s French comedy television series